Mubarak Shah (24 June 1930 – 19 January 2001) was a Pakistani long-distance runner who competed in the 1960 Summer Olympics. He is a double Asian Games gold medallist. Shah won gold in the 3000 m steeplechase and 5000 m at the 4th Asian Games held in Jakarta, Indonesia in 1962.

References

1930 births
2001 deaths
Pakistani male long-distance runners
Pakistani male steeplechase runners
Olympic athletes of Pakistan
Athletes (track and field) at the 1960 Summer Olympics
Asian Games medalists in athletics (track and field)
Asian Games gold medalists for Pakistan
Asian Games silver medalists for Pakistan
Athletes (track and field) at the 1958 Asian Games
Athletes (track and field) at the 1962 Asian Games
Commonwealth Games competitors for Pakistan
Athletes (track and field) at the 1958 British Empire and Commonwealth Games
Athletes (track and field) at the 1962 British Empire and Commonwealth Games
Medalists at the 1958 Asian Games
Medalists at the 1962 Asian Games
20th-century Pakistani people